John Roberts George Boulcott (ca.1826 – 12 March 1915) was an English organist and inventor.

Education

He was born in 1826, the son of John Boulcott and Harriet Spencer.

He married Grace Baker Pettipher on 9 October 1849 in St. Michael's Church, Bedwardine, Worcestershire.

On 23 December 1875 he submitted an application to the Office of the Commissioners of Patents for Inventions No.4497 “for the invention of improvements in diving apparatus useful also for other purposes”.

He died on 12 March 1915 in Llanishen, Glamorganshire. His grave is in St.Isan/Llanishen Cemetery, Cardiff, Wales.

Appointments

Assistant organist at Worcester Cathedral 1846 - 1847
Organist of Malvern Priory 1847
Organist of Church of the Holy Trinity, Stratford-upon-Avon 1847 - ????

References

1826 births
1915 deaths
English organists
British male organists
English composers
19th-century English musicians
19th-century British male musicians